The 2012–13 CERH Women's European League was the 7th season of Europe's premier female club roller hockey competition organized by CERH. The tournament was won by CP Voltregà, it took place in Girona.

Results

References

External links
 

Rink Hockey European Female League
CERH
CERH